Madingo Kayes  is an archaeological site in modern-day Republic of Congo, lying close to the town of Madingo-Kayes. It is the site of one of the earliest documented complex societies in West Central Africa.  Excavations conducted by James Denbow in the 1990s established a two order settlement pattern dated to the early centuries CE by Carbon-14 method.  At least three sites of differing sizes were found, although their connections and the existence of any sort of settlement or economic hierarchy have not yet been established.

References
Denbow, James. "Congo to Kalahari: data and hypotheses about the political economy of the western stream of the Early Iron Age." African Archaeological Review 1990, Volume 8, Issue 1, pp 139-175

Archaeological sites in the Republic of the Congo
Congo
1990s archaeological discoveries
Populated places established in the 1st century
1st-century establishments
Archaeological sites of Central Africa